Admiral of the Fleet Sir Chaloner Ogle KB (1681 – 11 April 1750) was a Royal Navy officer and politician. After serving as a junior officer during the Nine Years' War, a ship he was commanding was captured by three French ships off Ostend in July 1706 in an action during the War of the Spanish Succession.

Ogle was given command of the fourth-rate HMS Swallow and saw action against the pirate fleet of Bartholomew Roberts in the Battle of Cape Lopez in February 1722. The action was to prove a turning point in the war against the pirates and many consider the death of Roberts to mark the end of the Golden Age of Piracy.

In December 1741 Ogle was despatched with a fleet of some 30 ships to support Admiral Edward Vernon in his engagement with Spanish naval forces under Admiral Blas de Lezo off the coast of Colombia during the War of Jenkins' Ear. The attack on Fort San Lazaro was a disaster for the British forces and the Battle of Cartagena de Indias ultimately proved a decisive Spanish victory: 50 ships were lost, badly damaged or abandoned, and 18,000 soldiers and sailors died.

Ogle went on to be Commander-in-Chief, The Nore.

Early career
Born to John Ogle, a Newcastle barrister, and Mary (née Braithwaite) Ogle, Chaloner Ogle came from the Kirkley Hall branch of the prominent Northumbrian Ogle family of Northumberland. He joined the Royal Navy as a volunteer in July 1697. He served in the third-rate HMS Yarmouth and then the third-rate HMS Restoration in Autumn 1697 during the Nine Years' War and then served in the fourth-rate HMS Worcester followed by the third-rate HMS Suffolk in 1698. Promoted to lieutenant on 29 April 1702, he joined the third-rate HMS Royal Oak later that month.

Promoted to commander on 24 November 1703, Ogle was given command of the sloop HMS San Antonio which had been captured from Captain William Kidd. He transferred to the command of sixth-rate HMS Deal Castle in April 1705; his ship was captured by three French ships off Ostend in July 1706 in an action during the War of the Spanish Succession but he was acquitted at the subsequent court-martial and he was then given command of the sixth-rate HMS Queenborough. Promoted to captain on 14 March 1708, Ogle was given command of the fifth-rate  in the Mediterranean where he took several prizes. He then transferred to the fourth-rate HMS Plymouth and then to the fourth-rate HMS Worcester both in the Baltic Sea.

Ogle was given command of the fourth-rate HMS Swallow in March 1719 and saw action against the pirate fleet of Bartholomew Roberts in the Battle of Cape Lopez in February 1722. Ogle spotted three of Roberts' ships at anchor and initially pretended to flee: the pirate ship Ranger under Captain James Skyrme gave pursuit and was captured by HMS Swallow. Ogle then went after Roberts' flagship Royal Fortune which was anchored at Cape Lopez: Roberts tried to escape but Royal Fortune received a broadside from HMS Swallow as she passed and Roberts was killed in the action. Ogle was appointed a Knight Companion of the Order of the Bath in April 1723, the only British naval officer to be honoured specifically for his actions against pirates. The action was to prove a turning point in the war against the pirates and many consider the death of Roberts to mark the end of the Golden Age of Piracy.

Ogle was given command of the third-rate HMS Burford in the Channel Fleet in 1729 and of third-rate HMS Edinburgh in the Mediterranean in 1732. Promoted to commodore later that year he became Commander-in-Chief of the Jamaica Station with his broad pennant in the fourth-rate HMS Kingston.

Senior command

Promoted to rear-admiral on 11 July 1739, Ogle became second-in-command in the Mediterranean under Admiral Nicholas Haddock, with his flag in the fourth-rate HMS Augusta later that year, but then transferred to become third-in-command in the Channel under Sir John Norris, still with his flag in HMS Augusta, in 1740

In December 1741 Ogle was despatched with a fleet of some 30 ships to support Admiral Edward Vernon in his engagement with Spanish naval forces under Admiral Blas de Lezo off the coast of Colombia during the War of Jenkins' Ear. Ogle arrived in April 1742 and, after a week of bombardment of the City of Cartagena, the British made preparations to land near an access channel, Boca Chica, with 300 grenadiers. The Spanish defenders of two small, nearby forts, San Iago and San Philip, were driven off by a division of three ships of the fleet under Ogle but the British naval force suffered some 120 casualties with the third-rate HMS Shrewsbury alone losing 100 killed and wounded as well as taking serious damage from cannon fire from Fort San Luis. Although the grenadiers landed, the subsequent attack on Fort San Lazaro was a disaster for the British forces and the Battle of Cartagena de Indias ultimately proved a decisive Spanish victory: 50 ships were lost, badly damaged or abandoned, and 18,000 soldiers and sailors died. In the recriminations after the battle Ogle was accused of an assault upon Edward Trelawny, Governor of Jamaica in August 1742; he was tried in court but no judgement was given. Vernon was recalled and Ogle became Commander-in-Chief of the Jamaica Station again.

Promoted to vice-admiral on 11 August 1743, Ogle presided at the courts-martial of the captains accused of cowardice at the Battle of Toulon in February 1744. Promoted to full admiral on 23 June 1744, he became Commander-in-Chief, The Nore in September 1745. He was elected Member of Parliament for Rochester in November 1746 and promoted to Admiral of the Fleet on 1 July 1749. In retirement he lived at Gifford Lodge in Twickenham. He died in London on 11 April 1750 and was buried at St Mary's, Twickenham.  The monument was sculpted by John Michael Rysbrack.

Family
In October 1714, Ogle married Henrietta Isaacson. After the death of his first wife, he married Jane Isabella Ogle (a cousin) in October 1737; there were no children from either marriage.

References

Sources

External links
Chaloner Ogle Three Decks

|-

|-

|-

|-

1681 births
1750 deaths
Royal Navy admirals of the fleet
People involved in anti-piracy efforts
British MPs 1741–1747
British MPs 1747–1754
Members of the Parliament of Great Britain for English constituencies
British military personnel of the War of the Spanish Succession
Royal Navy personnel of the War of the Austrian Succession
British military personnel of the Nine Years' War